Ministry of Social Development may refer to:
 Ministry of Social Development (Argentina)
 Ministry of Social Development and Fight against Hunger (Brazil)
 Ministry of Information and Social Development (Kazakhstan)
 Ministry of Social Development (New Zealand)
 Ministry of Social Development (Panama)
 Ministry of Social Development and Human Security (Thailand)
 Ministry of Social Development (Uruguay)

See also
 Department of Social Development (disambiguation)
 Minister of Social Development (disambiguation)